Gismalla Abdalla Rassas, (1932–2013) was a South Sudanese politician and member of the Southern Sudan Liberation Movement, was the penultimate president of the High Executive Council of the Southern Sudan Autonomous Region, serving from 5 October 1981 to 23 June 1982. He was succeeded by Joseph James Tombura.

References

Presidents of South Sudan
1932 births
2013 deaths
20th-century South Sudanese people